Donald Joseph Hying (born August 18, 1963) is an American prelate of the Roman Catholic Church, serving as the bishop of the Diocese of Madison in Wisconsin since 2019.  Hying previously served as bishop of the Diocese of Gary (in Indiana and Illinois) from 2015 to 2019 and as an auxiliary bishop of the Archdiocese of Milwaukee in Wisconsin from 2011 to 2015.

Biography

Early life 
The youngest of six sons, Donald J. Hying was born on August 18, 1963, in West Allis, Wisconsin, to Albert and Catherine Hying. He attended St. Aloysius and Immaculate Heart of Mary grade schools, and graduated from Brookfield Central High School in Brookfield, Wisconsin.  Hying received his bachelor's degree from Marquette University and his Master of Divinity degree from Saint Francis de Sales Seminary in St. Francis, Wisconsin.

Priesthood 
On May 20, 1989, Hying was ordained a priest for the Archdiocese of Milwaukee by Archbishop Rembert Weakland. After his ordination, Hying was assigned as associate pastor of St. Anthony Parish in Menomonee Falls, Wisconsin, serving there for the next five years. 

In 1994, Hying traveled to the Dominican Republic to be a team member for the Sacred Family Parish in Sabana Yegua.  After returning to Wisconsin, he was appointed as temporary administrator in 1998 of St. Peter Parish in East Troy, Wisconsin.  Later that year, he was moved to St. Anthony Parish in Milwaukee, where he worked as associate pastor of St. for one year. 

Hying was appointed pastor in 1999 of Our Lady of Good Hope Parish in Milwaukee, remaining there until 2005. He then became the dean of formation at Saint Francis de Sales Seminary from 2005 until 2007, when was named rector.  In 2006, while serving  at the seminary, Hying was placed as a temporary administrator at St. Augustine Parish in Milwaukee.

Auxiliary Bishop of Milwaukee
On May 26, 2011, Pope Benedict XVI appointed Hying as titular bishop of Regiae and auxiliary bishop of the Archdiocese of Milwaukee. He was consecrated by Archbishop Jerome  Listecki on July 20, 2011.

Bishop of Gary

On November 24, 2014, Pope Francis appointed Hying as the fourth Bishop of the Diocese of Gary, replacing the retiring Bishop Dale Melczek. Hying's installation in Gary took place on January 6, 2015. While he was bishop of Gary, Hying oversaw that diocese's first synod in 2017.

Bishop of Madison
On April 25, 2019, Pope Francis named Hying as bishop of the Diocese of Madison to replace the deceased Bishop Robert Morlino.  He was installed on June 25, 2019. Hying was one of the few Catholic bishops to publicly criticize the removal of statues due to the George Floyd protests, especially those of Junípero Serra in California. He also condemned activist Shaun King's calling for images of Jesus as a white man to be destroyed.

In March 2020, Hying announced that investigators had found two sexual abuse allegations against Patrick Doherty, a retired priest from the Diocese of Madison, to be credible. Hying had already placed restrictions on Doherty.

See also

 Catholic Church by country
 Catholic Church hierarchy
 Catholic Church in the United States
 Historical list of the Catholic bishops of the United States
 List of Catholic bishops of the United States
 List of the Catholic dioceses of the United States
 Lists of patriarchs, archbishops, and bishops

References

External links

Roman Catholic Diocese of Madison Home Page  
Roman Catholic Diocese of Gary Home Page
Roman Catholic Archdiocese of Milwaukee

 

People from West Allis, Wisconsin
Marquette University alumni
St. Francis Seminary (Wisconsin) alumni
Roman Catholic bishops of Madison
Roman Catholic bishops of Gary
Roman Catholic Archdiocese of Milwaukee
1963 births
Living people
21st-century Roman Catholic bishops in the United States
Catholics from Wisconsin